Abakuasimbo is a village in Ituri province near the border with North Kivu in eastern Democratic Republic of the Congo. It is connected by road to Mbunia in the southeast.

External links
Maplandia World Gazetteer

Populated places in Ituri Province